Abraham Zangen (born 1969) is an Israeli professor of neuroscience, head of the brain stimulation and behavior lab and chair of the psychobiology brain program at Ben-Gurion University of the Negev (BGU).

Biography
Abraham Zangen was born in Jerusalem. He earned his B.Sc in pharmacology from the Hebrew University and his PhD from the Bar Ilan University in Israel in 1999. He then did a postdoc at the U.S. National Institutes of Health (NIH), which ended in 2003.

Zangen is married to Rachel, with whom he has six children.

Scientific career
Zangen studies neuroplasticity in the brain reward system and the effects of brain stimulation on neuroplasticity in psychiatric disorders including depression, addiction and attention deficits.

During his postdoc at the NIH, Zangen was part of a team that invented a magnetic coil called the "H coil" for use in transcranial magnetic stimulation (TMS); the coil allows deeper penetration of the magnetic field into the brain and the procedure wherein the H-coil was applied to TMS became known as "deep TMS".  The H-coil was patented by the NIH in 2002, and was licensed by the startup company Brainsway in 2003. He has continued to do research on applications for deep TMS.

In 2003, Zangen returned to Israel and  established a laboratory at the Weizmann Institute of Science, where he attained the rank of associate professor in 2010. In 2012 he joined the faculty of Ben-Gurion University of the Negev as an associate professor and was made a full professor in 2015.

The MIT Technology Review reported that Zangen and his team were evaluating the potential for disrupting areas of the brain that are overactive in cases of addiction or Obsessive compulsive disorder (OCD).

In 2018, the FDA granted de novo clearance to deep transcranial magnetic stimulation as a non-invasive treatment for OCD, after being cleared for treatment-resistant major depressive disorder in 2013.

In 2020, the FDA granted clearance for a different version of this technology for smoking cessation.

As of April 2021, over 100,000 patients around the world have been treated with Deep TMS. In 2023, a comparative study led by Zangen validated the efficacy of two different Deep TMS coils for treatment-resistant depression. The study also  indicated clinical and electrophysiological features that can be used to  select the best coil for a given patient. According to Zangen, this study is an "important scientific step forward towards personalized psychiatry."

Zangen has published over 150 peer-reviewed articles, reviews and book chapters.

Awards and recognition
Zangen has won prizes for his scientific achievements, among them the Medical Futures Innovation Award in the field of Mental Health and Neuroscience, UK, in 2007, the Sieratzki Prize for Advances in Neuroscience in 2010, the Juludan Research Prize in 2015  and the annual Innovation Award of Ben Gurion University in 2019.

Selected papers

See also
Science and technology in Israel
Health care in Israel
List of Israeli inventions and discoveries

References

External links
Deep Magnetic Brain Stimulation: An Experimental Treatment for Depression

1969 births
Living people
Israeli neuroscientists
Academic staff of Ben-Gurion University of the Negev
The Hebrew University-Hadassah Medical School alumni
Bar-Ilan University alumni
Israeli Jews